"I Drove All Night" is a song written and composed by American songwriters Billy Steinberg and Tom Kelly and originally intended for Roy Orbison. Orbison recorded the song in 1987, the year before his death, but his version was not released until 1992. Cyndi Lauper recorded the song and released it as a single for her A Night to Remember album. Her version became a top 10 hit on both sides of the Atlantic in 1989 and was also her final top 40 hit on the American pop charts. Lauper still regularly performs the song in her live concerts. The song has also been covered by Canadian singer Celine Dion, whose version topped the Canadian Singles Chart and reached number 7 on the US Adult Contemporary chart in 2003.

Cyndi Lauper version

"I Drove All Night" was recorded by American singer and songwriter Cyndi Lauper for her third solo album, A Night to Remember (1989). Lauper said she wanted to do it because she liked the idea "of a woman driving, of a woman in control." The song was a top 10 pop hit in the United States—and was her 8th and last US top 10 single to date, peaking at number six on the Billboard Hot 100, and also a hit in other countries. It received a Grammy Award nomination for Best Female Rock Vocal Performance. The music video for "I Drove All Night", directed by Scott Kalvert and Cyndi Lauper, features the opening lines from the song "Kindred Spirit", shots of an antique car, Lauper's characteristically manic dancing, and movie film projected onto Lauper's naked body.

Critical reception
Billboard reviewer described the music of this work as "yearning crystalline pop/rock" and found Lauper's vocal mature. Jerry Smith, reviewer of British music newspaper Music Week, called Lauper "American with good ear", priced her work for "assured and dramatic display" and expressed an assurance that this "passionate ballad" is "destined to return her to the charts once more".

Track listing and formats
 7" / cassette / US 3" CD / Japanese 3" CD
 "I Drove All Night" – 4:08
 "Maybe He'll Know" (Remix) – 3:41

 12" / European 3" CD / UK 5" CD
 "I Drove All Night" – 4:08
 "Maybe He'll Know" (Remix) – 3:41
 "Boy Blue" (Live at Le Zenith) – 5:36

 UK limited edition picture disc CD
 "I Drove All Night" – 4:08
 "What's Going On" (Club Version) – 6:35
 "Maybe He'll Know" (Remix) – 3:41
 "Time After Time" – 3:53

Charts

Weekly charts

Year-end charts

Release history

Roy Orbison version 

Jeff Lynne sampled Roy Orbison's 1987 recordings for the 1992 posthumous album King of Hearts, on which "I Drove All Night" was one of the tracks. However, Orbison's version of the song first appeared on the 1991 Super Mario World-themed compilation album Nintendo: White Knuckle Scorin'. Released as a single in June 1992, the song was a significant hit in the United Kingdom, reaching number 7 on the UK Singles Chart, matching the peak position of Lauper's version three years earlier. King of Hearts and "I Drove All Night" were generally well received in the United States, returning Orbison to the Billboard charts and receiving a Grammy Award. A music video featuring Jason Priestley and Jennifer Connelly was also made for the single, mixed with archive footage of Orbison and included a background reference to the Mario series. The song is featured in the film Paperback Hero starring Hugh Jackman.

Charts

Weekly charts

Year-end charts

Certifications

Celine Dion version

"I Drove All Night" was recorded by Celine Dion for her eighth English-language studio album, One Heart (2003), and released as the lead single on January 21, 2003. The song was featured in a promotional ad for Chrysler. The "I Drove All Night" music video was directed by Peter Arnell and released in February 2003. It was included on the United Kingdom enhanced double A-side single "One Heart/I Drove All Night". The song was commercially successful, reaching number 1 for five weeks in Canada, while also topping the charts in Belgium (Flanders) and Sweden.

Background 
In 2003, Chrysler signed Dion to a $14 million deal to endorse their cars. They were looking for a song to use in the campaign and release as a single. Billy Steinberg knew Dion and had written "Falling into You," which was the title track of her 1996 album. He sent a copy of Roy Orbison's version of "I Drove All Night" to her record company, who loved it and had Dion record it with Swedish producer Peer Astrom. She used the song in her Las Vegas show and it became the centerpiece of the Chrysler campaign. The commercials were great exposure for the song and helped sell many albums, but they did not sell enough cars. Chrysler pulled out of the deal after many of their dealers complained and it became clear the ads were not working.

In Dion's version, "I Drove All Night" is dance-pop. It was also considered "a little bit dance-club, a little bit rock & roll." In the second verse, Dion duplicates a line as it is heard in Orbison's original recording. Instead of singing, "no matter where I go I hear the beating of our heart," Dion sings, "our one heart," which is where the title of the album the song is featured on gets its name. Like the original, the chorus is sung again twice, which ends the single.

Composition
Dion's version of "I Drove All Night" is set in the key of G minor.  It features a moderately fast tempo of 135 beats per minute, and her vocals span from F3 to E5.

Critical reception 
The song received positive reviews from music critics. AllMusic senior editor Stephen Thomas Erlewine noticed that the song was "a tongue-in-cheek, neo-house cover" and picked it as one of the best tracks on the album, alongside the title track and "Have You Ever Been in Love." Rebecca Wallwork wrote a positive review for Amazon, calling it "the car-commercial-driven tempo," while Jam!'s Darryl Sterdan named it "a Cher-style eurodisco." Slant Magazines Sal Cinquemani echoed the same thought, saying that "she gets the Cher treatment on the blazing cover." Peoples Chuck Arnold wrote that in the song, Dion "shows surprising restraint for a diva who just had a coliseum custom-built for her."

The Guardians Betty Clarke wrote a negative review, saying: "Her cover of Roy Orbison's "I Drove All Night" is full of reverberating notes and sultry asides, but reveals a fundamental lack of sincerity that renders her threatening when she is trying for tender." David Browne of EW gave this cover C+, calling her delivery 'frigid' without over-singing it. He called the arrangement "blandly competent."

Commercial performance 
In Canada, the song debuted straight at number one on the Canadian Hot 100 chart and spent 5 consecutive weeks at the top. "I Drove All Night" was Dion's third airplay-only single that charted on the Billboard Hot 100, peaking at number 45. The commercial single was released five months later reaching number 26 on the Hot 100 Singles Sales. Because of several club remixes created mainly by Hex Hector, the song peaked at number 2 on the Hot Dance Club Play.

In Australia, the song debuted and peaked at number 22 on the ARIA Charts, on March 16, 2003. The following week, the song dropped to number 35 and it kept fluctuating on the chart for the next two weeks, until it climbed from number 44 to number 43. Later, the song fell to number 49, but it climbed to number 38, the following week. It spent 10 weeks on the chart and it was certified gold. In New Zealand, the song debuted at number 48 on the RIANZ chart, on March 2, 2003. The following week, the song climbed to number 46, while in its third week, it jumped to number 30. After falling to number 32, in its fourth week, the song remained at number 31, for two consecutive weeks. Finally, on April 20, 2003, the song rose and peaked at number 24. The song spent 9 weeks on the chart.

The song was even more successful on the Belgian Flanders Singles Chart, where it debuted at number 14, on March 8, 2004. The following week, the song jumped to number 4, while in its third week, the song topped the charts. It remained at the top ten for ten consecutive weeks and fifteen overall weeks on the chart. It was certified platinum, for selling 50,000 copies. The song was also a big success in Sweden, debuting at the top of the Swedish Singles Chart, on March 20, 2003. However, the following week, the song fell to number 12 and in its third week, it fell to number 13. In its fourth week, the song jumped to number 7, but it kept fluctuating on the chart for the next three weeks, until it climbed from number 22 to number 16. It spent 17 weeks on the chart. On the Danish Singles Chart, the song debuted at number 2, where it remained for three consecutive weeks. Later, it fell to number 5, while on the following week, it fell to number 6, where it remained for another week.

In France, even not reaching the top twenty, the song proved to be strong on the SNEP chart. It debuted at number 89, however, it fell to number 94 in its second week and to number 97 in its third week. Despite falling for two consecutive weeks and leaving the charts, the song re-entered at number 22, its peak position, on April 26, 2003. It spent 11 non-consecutive weeks on the chart.

Music video and promotion 
The music video shot in Las Vegas, USA on February 2, 2003, was directed by advertising executive Peter Arnell, cinematographed by Rolf Kestermann and edited by Bee Ottinger. An arty little black and white number, it features Dion, some arm stretches and back bends whilst a couple somewhere else seem to be merrily getting their groove on. It was included in the UK Enhanced CD Single of "One Heart". The music video was nominated for the MuchMoreMusic Award in 2003.

Dion appeared in four commercial spots—all scored with tracks from One Heart including "I Drove All Night"—for Chrysler, also directed by Arnell and edited by Ottinger, while Darius Khondji acted as director of photography on the ads.

Dion performed "I Drove All Night" during A New Day... show and included it on the A New Day... Live in Las Vegas CD in 2004 and Live in Las Vegas - A New Day... DVD in 2007. The A New Day... Live in Las Vegas bonus DVD, called One Year...One Heart contained the recording of the song and fragments from making the video.

The song became also an opening track for the 2008-09 Taking Chances World Tour, preceded by an introduction video using the remix of "I Drove All Night" as well. The audio and footage of this performance was included in the Taking Chances World Tour: The Concert CD/DVD. In October 2008, "I Drove All Night" was included on My Love: Essential Collection greatest hits. The song was also performed in Dion's 2017 European tour.

Track listing and formats

Australian CD single
"I Drove All Night" – 4:00
"I Drove All Night" (Hex Hector Extended Vocal Import Mix) – 7:53
"I Drove All Night" (Hex Hector Dub Import Mix) – 7:53
"Ten Days" – 3:37

Canadian CD single
"I Drove All Night" – 4:00
"I Drove All Night" (Hex Hector Extended Vocal Import Mix) – 7:53
"I Drove All Night" (Hex Hector Dub Import Mix) – 7:53

European CD single
"I Drove All Night" – 4:00
"I Drove All Night" (UK Radio Edit) – 3:37

European CD maxi-single
"I Drove All Night" – 4:00
"I Drove All Night" (UK Radio Edit) – 3:37
"I Drove All Night" (Hex Hector Extended Vocal Import Mix) – 7:53

French CD single
"I Drove All Night" – 4:00
"I Drove All Night" (UK Radio Edit) – 3:37
"I'm Alive" (Humberto Gatica Mix) – 3:30
"Je t'aime encore" – 3:24

UK CD single #1
"One Heart" – 3:24
"I Drove All Night" – 4:00
"I Drove All Night" (Hex Hector Extended Vocal Import Mix) – 7:53
"I Drove All Night" (Video) – 3:58

UK CD single #2 
"One Heart" – 3:24
"I Drove All Night" – 4:00
"All by Myself" – 5:12
"One Heart" (Video) – 3:25

US CD single
"I Drove All Night" – 4:00
"I Know What Love Is" – 4:28

US Chrysler Crossfire Experience CD-ROM
"I Drove All Night" (Alternate Mix) – 4:00
"I Drove All Night" (Music Video) - 3:58
"I Drove All Night" (Alternate Mix) (Chrysler Promotional Video Making-Of) - 4:45

Remixes

"I Drove All Night" (Hex Hector UK Radio Edit) – 3:37
"I Drove All Night" (Hex Hector Extended Vocal Import Mix) – 7:53
"I Drove All Night" (Hex Hector Dub Import Mix) – 7:53
"I Drove All Night" (Hex Hector UK Radio Mix A Capella) – 3:25
"I Drove All Night" (Chris "The Greek" Panaghi Radio Edit) – 3:49
"I Drove All Night" (Chris "The Greek" Panaghi Club Mix) – 6:06
"I Drove All Night" (Chris "The Greek" Panaghi Instrumental) – 6:06
"I Drove All Night" (Everbots Fasha Radio Mix) – 3:58
"I Drove All Night" (Everbots Fasha Mix) – 7:45
"I Drove All Night" (GW-1 Radio Remix) – 4:01
"I Drove All Night" (GW-1 Remix) – 7:03
"I Drove All Night" (Junior Vasquez Earth Anthem Mix) – 10:05
"I Drove All Night" (Original 3 Remix) – 3:48
"I Drove All Night" (Polarbabies In Prague Radio Mix) – 3:11
"I Drove All Night" (Polarbabies In Prague Club Mix) – 6:23
"I Drove All Night" (Seismic Crew Extended Mix) –  4:36
"I Drove All Night" (Starrie Knights Extended Mix) – 4:09
"I Drove All Night" (Wayne G Heaven Radio Edit) – 4:17
"I Drove All Night" (Wayne G Heaven Anthem Mix) – 7:41
"I Drove All Night" (Alternative Mix) - 4:00

Charts

Weekly charts

Year-end charts

Certifications and sales

Release history

See also

List of Billboard Hot 100 top 10 singles in 1989
List of number-one singles of 2003 (Canada)
List of number-one singles of the 2000s (Sweden)
List of UK top 10 singles in 1992
Ultratop 50 number-one hits of 2003

References

External links

1980s ballads
1987 songs
1989 singles
1992 singles
2002 singles
2003 singles
BNA Records singles
Canadian Singles Chart number-one singles
Celine Dion songs
Cyndi Lauper songs
Epic Records singles
Number-one singles in the Czech Republic
Number-one singles in Sweden
Pinmonkey songs
Rock ballads
Roy Orbison songs
Song recordings produced by Jeff Lynne
Song recordings produced by Paul Worley
Songs released posthumously
Songs about cars
Songs written by Billy Steinberg
Songs written by Tom Kelly (musician)
Ultratop 50 Singles (Flanders) number-one singles
Virgin Records singles